Michael James Breaugh (September 13, 1942 – November 22, 2019) was a Canadian politician. He served in the Legislative Assembly of Ontario from 1975 to 1990, and in the House of Commons of Canada from 1990 to 1993.

Background
Breaugh was educated at Peterborough Teachers' College, Queen's University and the University of Toronto. A teacher by training, he served on the executive of the Ontario English Catholic Teachers Association.

Politics
He was elected in the 1975 Ontario election.  A New Democrat, he won an easy victory in the working-class riding of Oshawa and was re-elected in the 1977 election.

The NDP had seemed poised for an electoral breakthrough in 1977, but instead fell from second to third-place status in the legislature. When Stephen Lewis stepped down as Ontario NDP leader in 1978, Breaugh ran to succeed him. He received 499 votes at the 1978 NDP leadership convention, finishing a strong third in a field of three candidates. Most of his supporters went to Michael Cassidy rather than presumed frontrunner Ian Deans on the second ballot, giving Cassidy a narrow victory.

Breaugh was re-elected in the 1981 election, though by a narrower margin than before.

Breaugh had a poor relationship with Bob Rae, who replaced Cassidy as party leader in 1982. The NDP experienced a modest recovery under Rae in the 1985 provincial election, and Breaugh was again re-elected by a significant margin in Oshawa.  In the 1987 election, he defeated Liberal candidate Cathy O'Flynn by the reduced margin of 2,916 votes as the Liberals won a landslide provincial majority.

Breaugh often clashed with Rae in the 1980s, criticising his leadership. In 1990, he left Queen's Park and ran for a seat in the House of Commons of Canada, in a by-election called in the federal Oshawa riding to fill the vacancy caused by the resignation of former New Democratic Party leader Ed Broadbent. Breaugh again defeated O'Flynn to win the by-election, which was held on August 13, a month before the 1990 Ontario election that brought Rae's NDP to power.

Rae's government was largely responsible for Breaugh's defeat at the polls in 1993. The provincial NDP had by this time lost much of its support from organized labour, through austerity legislation known as the Social Contract. This had a detrimental effect on the federal NDP, which lost all of its Ontario seats in the 1993 federal election. Breaugh was reduced to a fourth-place finish in Oshawa, where the local branch of the Canadian Auto Workers had previously disaffiliated from the NDP.

He supported Howard Hampton for leader of the Ontario NDP in 1996.

Breaugh died on November 22, 2019.

References

External links
 
 

1942 births
Canadian Roman Catholics
2019 deaths
Members of the House of Commons of Canada from Ontario
New Democratic Party MPs
Ontario New Democratic Party MPPs
Oshawa city councillors
People from Kingston, Ontario
University of Toronto alumni